Sonia Dada is the first full-length album from Sonia Dada, released in 1992 on Chameleon Records. It was re-released with two extra tracks in 1994 on Calliope Records; one of these tracks, "Paradise", would also be included on the 1998 album My Secret Life.

The album reached number two on the Australian ARIA Charts and was the 13th highest selling album for the year of 1993.

Track listing
"We Treat Each Other Cruel" – 4:09
"You Don't Treat Me No Good" – 4:08
"Jungle Song" – 4:42
"As Hard as It Seems" – 3:59
"You Ain't Thinking (About Me)" – 3:59
"The Edge of the World" – 4:31
"Cut It Up & Cry" – 4:39
"New York City" – 3:27
"Never See Me Again" – 3:57
"I Live Alone" – 3:54
"Deliver Me" – 4:41
"Deliver Me (Slight Return)" – 2:17

The re-released album had the following extra tracks at the end of the album:
 "Paradise" – 5:08
"Mamba Wan Gama" – 1:27

Charts

Weekly charts

Year-end charts

Certifications

References

1992 debut albums
Sonia Dada albums
Chameleon (label) albums